Diógenes Domínguez (born 1902, date of death unknown) was a Paraguayan football forward who played for Paraguay in the 1930 FIFA World Cup. He also played for Club Sportivo Luqueño.

References

External links
FIFA profile

1902 births
Paraguayan footballers
Paraguay international footballers
Association football forwards
Sportivo Luqueño players
1930 FIFA World Cup players
Year of death missing